Green Road is a railway station on the Cumbrian Coast Line, which runs between  and . It is owned by Network Rail and managed by Northern Trains.

Green Road has been adopted since 1981 and is currently a member of Northern Trains' station adoption scheme. The station has won a number of awards for its gardens.

Facilities
The station is not staffed but has now been provided with a ticket vending machine (card only) to allow intending travellers to buy tickets before boarding. The brick main building is not in public use, but there are waiting shelters on each side. Step-free access to both platforms is via ramps from the road that crosses the railway here (the automated level crossing is immediately to the south of the station).  Train running information is provided by posters, digital display screens and telephone.

Services

Most daytime northbound trains continue to Whitehaven and Carlisle.

A Sunday service was introduced at the May 2018 timetable change – this runs hourly from mid-morning until the evening (though certain trains only run as far as Millom). This is the first such service on the Coast line for more than forty years.

References

External links

 
 

Railway stations in Cumbria
DfT Category F2 stations
Former Furness Railway stations
Railway stations in Great Britain opened in 1853
Northern franchise railway stations
Railway request stops in Great Britain